Faysal Bank Limited is a Pakistani Islamic bank, a subsidiary of KSA Holdings ultimate parent of bank is KSA Holdings and Ithmaar Bank, based in Karachi, Pakistan. It is named after Mohammed bin Faisal Al Saud.

History
Faysal Bank started in Pakistan in October 1987 with a tiny branch and as a subsidiary of Faysal Islamic Bank, a Bahraini bank owned by Mohammed bin Faisal Al Saud, the son of the late King Faisal of Saudi Arabia.

It was incorporated in Pakistan on 3 October 1994 as a public limited company under the Companies Ordinance, 1984.

In 2014 it announced to convert itself into a full-fledged Islamic Bank in three to five years. It finally converted to a full-fledged Islamic bank by December 2022.

References

External links

 Faysal Bank official website

Banks established in 1994
Banks of Pakistan
Companies based in Karachi
Companies listed on the Pakistan Stock Exchange
Islamic banks of Pakistan
Pakistani companies established in 1994
Pakistani subsidiaries of foreign companies